Denailing is the extraction of the nails from the fingers and/or toes, either as an accident, a medical procedure to treat severe nail infections, or as a method of torture.

Health consequences
Removed nails are capable of growing back normally over several months if the nail matrix is left intact through surgical extraction. However, if the matrix is damaged by trauma, it can result in an overgrowth of tissue from the proximal nail fold, resulting in the formation of pterygium. Particularly, if the nail matrix is burnt by a heated instrument, subsequent growth may produce nails which are striped, thin, or broken into longitudinal segments.

History of use as torture
Medieval sources described the exquisite torture, which begins by securing the prisoner face upward to a tabletop, fixing the hands by chains around the wrists and the bare feet by chains around the ankles.  A metal forceps or pliers, often heated red-hot, individually grasps each nail in turn and slowly pries it from the nail bed before tearing it free from the digit. A more painful variant used in medieval Spain was performed by introducing a sharp wedge of wood or metal between the flesh and each nail and slowly hammering the wedge under the nail until it was torn free.  Along with foot roasting, this savage procedure was used to break the Knights Templar; the remarkably bitter cruelty sometimes shattering Knights' sanity. Another cruel variant of the denailing torture involved using rough skewers of wood or bone dipped in boiling sulfur. A number of such skewers were slowly driven into the flesh under the prisoner's toenails. Alternately, the skewer was dipped in boiling oil, which served a dual purpose of both burning the incredibly sensitive flesh and lubricating the needle so that the torturer could freely explore a wide surface area beneath the toenail. When enough skewers had been driven home to pry each nail loose from its bed, the nail was torn out at the root with a pair of pliers. The German witch hunters were especially fond of this ingenious torture, which was as easily administered as it was portable and inexpensive.

More recently, the denailing torture found favorite application during the Armenian genocide of the 1910s. The United Nations Istanbul Protocol describes nail removal and the insertion of objects such as wire under the nail as forms of torture. Torturers explored the sensitive beds beneath the nails of their prisoners' fingers and toes before tearing out the nails with red-hot pliers.

In the aftermath of Italy's republican referendum after World War II, efforts to prosecute former officials in the Fascist government for collaborationism and war crimes resulted in the legal differentiation between the concepts of normal brutality, cruel brutality, and particularly cruel brutality. Only in the case of particularly cruel brutality would the accused be rejected for amnesty. Denailing was generally considered to fall under the first two categories, as for a brutality to be considered particularly cruel, it had to "horrify even those who are familiar with torture."

Modern use 
The Independent International Fact-Finding Mission on Venezuela documented that senior lieutenant Franklin Caldera, detained on 2019 during the Nicolás Maduro administration, was subjected to several methods of torture, including cutting and insertion of needles under his fingernails. On 3 November 2022, pro-government colectivos attacked and denailed four female students of the University of the Andes that were protesting against the visit in Mérida state of Diosdado Cabello, vice-president of the United Socialist Party of Venezuela (PSUV).

Under the Daniel Ortega administration, political prisoners in Nicaragua have been subjected to torture, including denailing.

In fiction 
The 2009 film District 9 includes a denailing scene.

The 2022 film  The Gray Man includes a denailing scene at the 1-hour mark.

See also
 Nail (anatomy)
 List of methods of torture

Notes

Further reading
 M. Donnelly and D. Diehl, The Big Book of Pain (Scroud, Gloucestershire, U.K.: The History Press, 2011).

Nails (anatomy)
Torture